Rider of the Plains is a 1931 American Western film directed by John P. McCarthy and starring Tom Tyler, Lilian Bond and Al Bridge.

Main cast
 Tom Tyler as Blackie Saunders 
 Lilian Bond as Betty Harper 
 Al Bridge as Deputy Bill Gaines 
 Ted Adams as Parson Jim Wallace 
 Gordon De Main as Sheriff John Evans 
 Andy Shuford as Silent Sandy 
 Slim Whitaker as Deputy Castro 
 Fern Emmett as Miss Whipple

Plot
A reformed outlaw (Saunders) adopts an orphan (Silent Sandy). When some citizens of the town discover Saunders's background, they contrive a scheme to take Sandy away by implicating Saunders in a robbery. Sandy gives a false witness account to protect Saunders, and the real perpetrators are caught.

References

Bibliography
 Michael R. Pitts. Poverty Row Studios, 1929–1940: An Illustrated History of 55 Independent Film Companies, with a Filmography for Each. McFarland & Company, 2005.

External links
 

1931 films
1931 Western (genre) films
American Western (genre) films
Films directed by John P. McCarthy
1930s English-language films
1930s American films